The 1979 World Wrestling Championships were held in San Diego, California, United States. As during the 1973 edition, the venue, San Diego State University Arena hosted the Pan American Sambo Championships very next day after the freestyle event finale.

Medal table

Team ranking

Medal summary

Men's freestyle

Men's Greco-Roman

References
FILA Database
Page 48–49

World Wrestling Championships
W
W
International wrestling competitions hosted by the United States